O Irixo is a municipality in Ourense in the Galicia region of north-west Spain. It is located in the very northwest of the province.

References

Municipalities in the Province of Ourense